Thomas Carlton may refer to:

Thomas Carlton (mayor), mayor of Frederick, Maryland
Tom Carlton, a cricketer in New Zealand and Australia from 1909 to 1932

See also
Thomas Carleton (disambiguation)